Alexis Arias (born 19 October 1969) is a Cuban former rower. He competed in the men's lightweight double sculls event at the 1996 Summer Olympics.

References

External links
 

1969 births
Living people
Cuban male rowers
Olympic rowers of Cuba
Rowers at the 1996 Summer Olympics
People from Villa Clara Province
Pan American Games medalists in rowing
Pan American Games gold medalists for Cuba
Pan American Games silver medalists for Cuba
Rowers at the 1991 Pan American Games
Rowers at the 1995 Pan American Games
Medalists at the 1991 Pan American Games
Medalists at the 1995 Pan American Games